Zolochiv Raion is a name of two former subdivisions in Ukraine.

 Zolochiv Raion, Kharkiv Oblast
 Zolochiv Raion, Lviv Oblast